The Green Ray is a novel by the French writer Jules Verne published in 1882 and named after the optical phenomenon of the same name. It is referenced in a 1986 film of the same name by Eric Rohmer.

Plot summary 
The heroes are trying to observe the green ray in Scotland. After numerous attempts are obstructed by clouds, flocks of birds or distant boat sails, the phenomenon is eventually visible but the heroes, finding love in each other's eyes, don't pay attention to the horizon.

Scientific basis 
Green flashes and green rays are rare optical phenomena that occur shortly after sunset or before sunrise, when a green spot is visible for a short period of time above the sun, or a green ray shoots up from the sunset point. It is usually observed from a low altitude where there is an unobstructed view of the horizon, such as on the ocean. The idea in the novel that one can predict where and when to observe the green ray has no scientific basis. The rays are regularly sighted by airplane pilots because they often can see the true horizon in mid flight, more often when flying west because the sun's relative motion is slightly slower.

Cited in Eric Rohmer's 1986 film, the green ray is used as a leitmotiv, providing meaning and guidance for the film's troubled main character, Delphine. Verne's book is discussed at length in the film as a "fairytale love story" whose protagonists are consumed in their search for the rare meteorological phenomenon. Believed to give a heightened perception to those who view it, one of the characters further explains that "when you see the green ray you can read your own feelings and others too".

Illustration from the book

References

External links
 
 
 The Green Ray on Google Books
 The Green Ray, audio version  (in French)

1882 French novels
1882 science fiction novels
Novels by Jules Verne
Novels set in Scotland
French novels adapted into films
Nautical novels